Lancaster Historic District is a historic district in Lancaster, Ohio.  It was listed on the National Register of Historic Places in 1983.

The Lancaster historic district includes the historic central business district of Lancaster, including most of the original town as laid out in 1800.  It includes two previously existing local historic districts: the West Main Street Historic District and the Square 13 Historic District. The district contains numerous historic homes and buildings that were built in more than a dozen diverse architectural styles. Several museum houses are located within the district including the Sherman House Museum, The Georgian Museum, and the Decorative Arts Center of Ohio housed in the Reese-Peters mansion.

Gallery

References

National Register of Historic Places in Fairfield County, Ohio
Historic districts on the National Register of Historic Places in Ohio
Georgian architecture in Ohio
Italianate architecture in Ohio